The word cruzado (Portuguese for "crusader") may mean:

 the Brazilian cruzado, Brazilian currency from 1986 to 1989
 the Brazilian cruzado novo, Brazilian currency from 1989 to 1990
 the Portuguese cruzado, an old Portuguese coin, either gold (15th centuries) or silver (16th to 19th centuries)
Cruzados, an American rock band of the 1980s
Cruzados, the debut album of the Cruzados rock band

People with the surname
Luis Cruzado (1941–2013), Peruvian footballer
Rinaldo Cruzado (born 1984), Peruvian footballer